Wild Mouse is a Maurer steel roller coaster currently operating at Lagoon Amusement Park in Farmington, Utah.

History

Previous Wild Mouse Rides at Lagoon 
Wild Mouse opened as a wooden roller coaster in 1965 after being relocated from the Seattle World's Fair. After operating in its location in Lagoon's North Midway, it was eventually retired in 1971. 

In 1973, the Wild Mouse roller coaster returned to Lagoon as "The New Wilder Wild Mouse." The new version of the ride was located at the South Midway, in the same location where the current Wild Mouse operates. Since this ride featured the same layout and look of the previous Wild Mouse, it's assumed this is the same ride installed in 1965. This version of the ride operated until 1989, when Lagoon decided to retire the Wild Mouse again. 

A common myth among local Utah residents is that one of these Wild Mouse coasters has had one or more severe accidents causing injury or death. However, there has been no verifiable evidence to conclude there has ever been a major incident on any Wild Mouse ride at Lagoon.

Current Wild Mouse Ride 
In 1998, Wild Mouse returned as a steel roller coaster. This version featured a similar layout to the original and was built in the same location as the 1973 version but is an all new ride built by Maurer Söhne. In the ride's first two seasons, there was no themed tunnel (decorated to look like a house) on the ride. This element was added beginning with the 2000 season.

Layout 
Like many other Wild Mouse roller coasters manufactured by Maurer Söhne, Wild Mouse features a layout that weaves in and out of itself with several hairpin turns and stiff brakes until riders reach the station again to complete the circuit. 

Wild Mouse originally had a purple and yellow color scheme, but it was repainted green and yellow for the 2013 season. Cars are painted to look like cats or mice to fit the theme of the ride.

References 

Lagoon (amusement park)
1998 establishments in Utah